Federal Assembly may refer to:

Federal Assembly (Russia), the Russian federal parliament
Federal Assembly (Czechoslovakia), the former Czechoslovak federal parliament
Federal Assembly (Federation of Rhodesia and Nyasaland), the former federal parliament of the Federation of Rhodesia and Nyasaland
Federal Assembly of Yugoslavia

Under the German name Bundesversammlung: 
Federal Assembly (Austria), the name for a joint session of the two chambers of the Austrian federal parliament
Federal Convention (Germany), a formal convention that elects the country's Federal President
Federal Convention (German Confederation), the only organ of the German Confederation (1815-1866)
Federal Assembly (Switzerland), the Swiss federal parliament